Tim Wilhelmus Janssen (born 6 March 1986 in Eindhoven) is a Dutch footballer who currently plays as a striker for RKSV Nuenen.

Career
He made his debut in the professional football squad of FC Zwolle in the 2004–05 season. He also played for FC Eindhoven before joining RKC Waalwijk.

In 2007 Janssen was called up by Jong Oranje coach Foppe de Haan to be part of his squad for the 2007 UEFA European Under-21 Football Championship where they qualified for the 2008 Summer Olympics. He scored his first and only goal for Jong Oranje to ensure that they won their final warm-up match against Poland before the competition. At the 2007 UEFA European Under-21 Championship, Janssen came on as a substitute and scored both penalties he took during the series (1–1, 13–12 after 32 penalty kicks) in the semi-finals against England. The Dutch went on to retain their 2006 title by beating Serbia 4–1 in the final.

In 2017, Janssen played for RKSV Nuenen.

Personal life
His father Willy Janssen was also a professional footballer.

Honours
UEFA U-21 Championship 2007

References

External links
Voetbal International profile
UEFA profile
Official danish Superliga stats

1986 births
Living people
Dutch footballers
Netherlands youth international footballers
Netherlands under-21 international footballers
Dutch expatriate footballers
PEC Zwolle players
FC Eindhoven players
RKC Waalwijk players
NEC Nijmegen players
Footballers from Eindhoven
PSV Eindhoven players
Esbjerg fB players
FC Midtjylland players
De Graafschap players
Fortuna Sittard players
OKC Energy FC players
Eredivisie players
Eerste Divisie players
Danish Superliga players
USL Championship players
Expatriate men's footballers in Denmark
Expatriate soccer players in the United States
Association football forwards
RKSV Nuenen players